Kirill Andreyevich Zaytsev (born August 16, 1987) is a Russian actor, film director, producer. For his role in Going Vertical he received the Golden Eagle Award in 2019.

Life and career 
Kirill Zaytsev was born in Volgograd, Russian SFSR, Soviet Union (now Russia). In his youth he studied music, dancing, basketball. In 2011 he graduated from the Admiral Makarov State Maritime Academy, moved to Riga, where he was accepted into the troupe of The Mikhail Chekhov Riga Russian Theatre.

In 2016, Kirill Zaytsev starred in one of the main roles in the highest-grossing Russian film Going Vertical, playing the legendary Soviet basketball player Sergei Belov, based on whose book the film was filmed.

In 2018, he played the main role of American John Mackenzie, who comes to the Investigative Committee of Russia for the exchange of experience, - in the Channel One television series Cop by Radda Novikova.

Since 2018 he has been collaborating with the Moscow Provincial Theatre.  Plays Nicholas I in Sergei Bezrukov's production of Pushkin about the Russian poet and Erast Fandorin in the production of Fandorin's Adventures.  In 2021, Kirill Zaitsev  acted in the premiere of the solo play My Lermontov staged by director Elena Chernaya.  The script of the performance was written based on the poems, prose and letters of Mikhail Lermontov.

In 2020 Zaytsev directed his debut short film, war drama Sashka. A Soldier's Diary. The film won various awards at international film festivals, including the Prague Independent Film Festival (in 2021). It was also the first short film to have a wide cinematic release in Russia (in 2022).

In 2021, he took part in the ice-dancing TV show Ice Age on Channel One.  His partner in the project was the Russian world champion figure skater Oksana Domnina.  The couple reached the grand final and took third place.

In 2022 Zaytsev had a supporting role in streaming fantasy series Aeterna.

Selected filmography

Film

Television

References

External links 
 Kirill Zaytsev on kino-teatr.ru

1987 births
Actors from Volgograd
Russian male film actors
Russian male television actors
Russian male stage actors
21st-century Russian male actors
Living people
Mass media people from Volgograd